The 1967 Cork Intermediate Hurling Championship was the 58th staging of the Cork Intermediate Hurling Championship since its establishment by the Cork County Board in 1909.

Ballincollig won the championship following a 3–08 to 3–07 defeat of Cobh in the final. This was their sixth championship title overall and their first title since 1939.

References

Cork Intermediate Hurling Championship
Cork Intermediate Hurling Championship